Lloyd Thomas Hinchberger (October 10, 1930 – October 3, 2015) was a Canadian professional hockey player who played 587 games in the Eastern Hockey League for the Washington Presidents, New Haven Blades, and Nashville Dixie Flyers.

References

External links
 

1930 births
2015 deaths
Eastern Hockey League coaches
Ice hockey people from Ontario
Nashville Dixie Flyers players
New Haven Blades players
People from Parry Sound District
Southern Hockey League (1973–1977) coaches
Canadian ice hockey defencemen
Canadian ice hockey coaches